

This is a list of the Areas of Special Scientific Interest (ASSIs) in County Londonderry in Northern Ireland, United Kingdom.

In Northern Ireland the body responsible for designating ASSIs is the Northern Ireland Environment Agency – a division of the Department of Environment (DoE).

Unlike the SSSIs, ASSIs include both natural environments and man-made structures. As with SSSIs, these sites are designated if they have criteria based on fauna, flora, geological or physiographical features. On top of this, structures are also covered, such as the Whitespots mines in Conlig, according to several criterion including rarity, recorded history and intrinsic appeal.

For other sites in the rest of the United Kingdom, see List of SSSIs by Area of Search.

Data is available from the Northern Ireland Environment Agency's website in the form of citation sheets for each ASSI.

 Aghanloo Wood ASSI
 Altikeeragh ASSI
 Altmover Glen ASSI
 Ballyknock ASSI
 Ballymacallion ASSI
 Ballymacombs More ASSI
 Ballynahone Bog ASSI
 Ballyrisk More ASSI
 Banagher Glen ASSI
 Bann Estuary ASSI
 Binevenagh ASSI
 Bonds Glen ASSI
 Bovevagh ASSI
 Carn / Glenshane Pass ASSI
 Castle River Valley ASSI
 Coolnasillagh ASSI
 Crockaghole Wood ASSI
 Curran Bog ASSI
 Dead Island Bog ASSI
 Drumbally Hill ASSI
 Errigal Glen ASSI
 Ervey Wood ASSI
 Gortcorbies ASSI
 Lough Beg ASSI
 Lower Creevagh ASSI
 Lough Foyle ASSI
 Lough Neagh ASSI
 Loughermore Mountain ASSI
 Magilligan ASSI
 Moneystaghan Bog ASSI
 Ness Wood ASSI
 River Faughan and Tributaries ASSI
 River Roe and Tributaries ASSI
 Smulgedon ASSI
 Sruhanleanantawey Burn ASSI
 Teal Lough and Slaghtfreeden Bogs ASSI
 Teal Lough Part II ASSI
 Toome ASSI
 Tully Hill ASSI
 Wolf Island Bog ASSI

References

Areas of Special Scientific Interest in Northern Ireland
Geography of County Londonderry
Areas of Special Scientific